is an action role-playing video game developed by Noise and published by Nintendo for the Nintendo 64 in 1999 in Japan, and in 2006 for the iQue Player in China. It is the first game in the Custom Robo series. The game and its sequel Custom Robo V2 were re-released on the Nintendo Switch Online + Expansion Pack in Japan in July 2022.

Plot
The player receives a Custom Robo called Ray on their birthday, which inspires them to find opponents to battle in order to collect as many parts as possible and become a Custom Robo Master. Winning battles rewards the player with money and custom robo parts.

Gameplay 
The player moves around through various scenes and settings, interacting with other characters to gain information or engage in combat. Once the player has started a battle with another character, the scene changes to show the holoseum, or arena, in which the robots will be fighting. At the start of a battle, the player changes the direction of a robo cannon that launches the robot into the holoseum as a cube. In order to open the robo, the player must quickly press buttons and directions on the control stick. Depending on which side the cube lands on, the player may have more or less difficulty opening their robo. Once the robots have been launched onto the arena, they must fight using a variety of different weapons. The robot's arsenal includes guns, bombs, pods, and the ability to rocket punch. The robot also has a jetpack which allows for dashing to avoid enemy attacks. During battle, the endurance bar will decrease for each action performed. Once the bar runs out, the robot will become downed and unable to move. Once the robot recovers, it enters rebirth mode and will experience a brief period of invincibility. In order to win the battle, the player must reduce the opponent's health from 1000 to zero. If the player wins a battle, they will usually receive a new robot part from their opponent, allowing for customization. Rather than receiving the parts directly, the player usually must go to one of several parts machines to pick up the new part. The goal of the story mode is to defeat all of the other Robos and collect all of the parts. Any part that the player collects in story mode can then be used in versus mode to customize your robot and battle against friends. Others can bring their own Custom Robos to battle on your Nintendo 64 using a Nintendo 64 Memory Pack.

Development 
Custom Robo is targeted at young boys in Japan who enjoy playing with action figures and toy models. Noise, the developers of the game, said that their inspiration was the childhood fantasy of being able to become the action figure and play out battles. From this idea, the Custom Robos within the game were designed to be similar to real life Japanese model toys, with interchangeable parts and bodies able to move and pose with a limited degree of rotation. Many weapons and parts obtainable throughout the game have a variety of themes from frogs to beetles to sharks, animals that a young boy may play with or find to be appealing. The game seems to focus on friendly rivalries between the characters, and the main character usually befriends the opponent at the end of the battle in some way or another.

Reception and sales

Custom Robo sold 35,579 copies during its first week of sale in Japan. The suggested retail price was 6,800 yen (about US$65).

Reviews
In the reviews on Custom Robo from GameSpot and IGN they talk about many of the game's features. Both mention that it is easy to control and responds well, and IGN states that the game's drive for the player to adapt to controlling each new weapon adds to its value. Both reviewers made remarks about the odd graphic styles of the game, while GameSpot takes particular notice of the music. GameSpot reviewer James Mielke says that it has "some of the coolest, clanky big-robot sound effects ever heard in a game", but described the soundtrack as "often sounding completely out of place with the action is a score that seems better suited to a Ringling Bros. and Barnum & Bailey circus atmosphere than a hi-tech game of robo combat".

English version
A fan-made English patch was released in September 2017, nearly 18 years after the game's release. An unofficially released cartridge of the translation, designed to be played on an American Nintendo 64, was also pressed/released some time later.

Notes

References

External links
Official website 
Official iQue website  
Custom Robo at IGN

Action role-playing video games
Custom Robo
IQue games
Nintendo 64 games
Noise (company) games
1999 video games
Video games developed in Japan
Video games scored by Shinji Hosoe
Multiplayer and single-player video games
Nintendo Switch Online games